In Spe was an Estonian rock band which was established in 1979.

Members
 Alo Mattiisen
 Anne Tüür 
 Arvo Urb
 Erkki-Sven Tüür
 Ivo Varts
 Jaanus Nõgisto
Jüri Tamm
Mart Metsala
Peeter Brambat
Priit Kuulberg
 Riho Sibul
Toivo Kopli.

Discography

Albums
1983 "In Spe"
1985 "In Spe"

References

Estonian musical groups
Estonian progressive rock groups